The spot-winged thrush, (Geokichla spiloptera), is an Asian thrush, a group within the large thrush family Turdidae.

It is an endemic resident breeder in Sri Lanka. This uncommon species breeds in hill rainforests, and to a lesser extent in drier woodlands, at altitudes between 500 and 2000 m.

The wintering areas are similar but include less well-wooded areas, and are generally at 750 to 1500 m altitude. The spot-winged thrush is generally solitary and can be quite secretive, especially in the dense undergrowth and bamboo clumps it favours.

Spot-winged thrushes are omnivorous, but eat far more insects than fruit. They feed on the ground.

Adults of this medium-sized thrush, which measures  in total length and weighs  are light brown above with a double wing bar of white spots. The pale face has two dark bars. The underparts are white with heavy spotting. The bill is black and legs are yellow. The song is a rich and varied whistling.

Young birds have buff streaking on the upperparts, and the face and the underparts are light brown with heavy streaking.

The loose cup nests are lined with vegetation and placed in a tree fork. 2-3 buff or bluish-green eggs are laid. This species raises two broods each year.

In culture
In Sri Lanka, this bird is known as Pulli Wal Awichchiya in the Sinhala language.

Gallery

References
Citations

Sources
 Birds of India by Grimmett, Inskipp and Inskipp, 
 Thrushes by Clement and Hathaway, 

spot-winged thrush
Endemic birds of Sri Lanka
spot-winged thrush
spot-winged thrush